Zug railway station serves the municipality of Zug, the capital city of the canton of Zug, Switzerland.

Opened in 1897, the station is owned and operated by Swiss Federal Railways (SBB CFF FFS). It is a keilbahnhof: it forms the junction between the Zürich–Lucerne railway and the Thalwil–Arth-Goldau railway, which connects with the Gotthard railway.

Every day, some 46,000 people pass through the station.

Location
Zug railway station is situated in Bahnhofplatz, right in the heart of the city centre, a short distance from the shore of Lake Zug.

History
The first railway station in Zug was built in 1863-1864 by the architect Friedrich Jacob Wanner, in what is now the Bundesplatz. It was a terminal station, which could be reached only from the direction of Cham and Knonau. With an additional junction, trains could be turned.  In 1897, as the railway lines to Zürich via Thalwil and to Arth-Goldau were opened, the station had to be moved to its current site. The original station building was dismantled and rebuilt in Zürich Wollishofen.

Station building
Between 2001 and 2004, a redesigned station building was constructed at the station, at a cost of some 65 million Swiss francs. The building area is approximately 6500 m2.

The redesigned building consists of a basement used for storage, one retail space at street level and another at platform level, and three floors of office space above. A total of 14 retail stores are located in the retail spaces.  A new passage to the station entrance was specially built, so that pedestrians can reach the concourse more easily. Additionally, the separate Grafenau and Metalli quarters are now easier to reach. For the cyclists, new shelters were built. The newly created Bahnhofsplatz serves as a bus turning area. There are also internet connections, via wireless LAN, at certain locations within the station.

From the onset of dusk until 23:00 hours, the station building is illuminated by a light installation by artist James Turrell. For that purpose, the southern glass facade is equipped with fluorescent tubes, which are mounted so that the colors red, green and blue and resulting mixed colors can be created. As the control system of the light elements can suffer technical problems during long-lasting cold weather, the installation is shut down in such weather.

On 19 October 2005, the station received a Brunel Award for its architecture and light installation.

Layout 
The station has seven tracks, of which one is a terminating track, while the other six are through tracks. Altogether, there is a side platform and three island platforms, one of which is laid out in a wedge shape (tracks 3/4). One of the remaining island platforms is a partial side platform, due to the head track status of track 1.

Summary of track usage:

Services 
 the following services call at Zug:

 InterRegio:
 Zürich S-Bahn:

Interchange 
The station is the main hub of the Zug Stadtbahn, and is also part of the Zürich S-Bahn.

Social Attractions 
Young locals regularly make use of Zug's railway station as a social meeting point. The stairs extending from platforms 4 and 5 act as a space within which individuals may convene. Proximity to shops, kiosks and food stores helps to improve the station's prominence amongst local youths, especially when considering the relatively high concentration of nearby amenities and parks. The Mr. Pickwick Pub located just south of the station is popular amongst both expats and locals alike; situated parallel to Alpenstrasse, the pub is easily accessible, making use of English-speaking employees as means to attract Zug's international community.

See also

History of rail transport in Switzerland
Rail transport in Switzerland

References

External links
 
 
 Interactive station plan (Zug)

Railway stations in the canton of Zug
Swiss Federal Railways stations
Zug
Railway stations in Switzerland opened in 1897